William Whitfield III (June 1, 1743 in Rockford, North Carolina – March 1817) was a soldier and slave owner. The son of William Whitfield II, he fought in the Battle of Moore's Creek Bridge during the American Revolutionary War.

In 1778, Whitfield was appointed justice of the peace for Dobbs County. Along with his son, he was a director and trustee for designing and building the town of Wanesboro.
He married four times and had 29 children. Forty of his descendants served in the Confederate army. He died in March, 1817.

References

1743 births
1817 deaths
People from Rockford, North Carolina
American justices of the peace
Whitfield family
People from Dobbs County, North Carolina
People from Goldsboro, North Carolina
American slave owners